"Making Our Dreams Come True" is a 1976 hit single written by Charles Fox and Norman Gimbel. It was recorded by Cyndi Grecco, then an unknown musician.  The title track of her debut album, it was also used as the theme song to the 1976–83 television sitcom Laverne & Shirley (where it was titled "We're Gonna Make It" in the first-season end credits).

"Making Our Dreams Come True" reached number 25 on the U.S. Billboard Hot 100 and number 21 on the Cash Box Top 100. The song reached number 16 in Canada on the RPM Weekly Top Singles chart. It spent 16 weeks on the U.S. charts, peaking in early July, and also reached number 13 on the Adult Contemporary chart. To date, it is Grecco's lone record to reach any chart.

Chart performance

Weekly charts

Year-end charts

Cover versions
Johnny Cash covered the song for a commercial for Nissan, highlighting the Japanese automaker's American workforce. As of 2023, the recording has yet to be officially released.

A country version of the song was used in the game Wasteland 3 for the final boss fight of the second DLC, The Cult of the Holy Detonation.

See also
 List of 1970s one-hit wonders in the United States

References

External links
 Lyrics of this song
 

1976 songs
1976 singles
Songs with music by Charles Fox (composer)
Songs with lyrics by Norman Gimbel
Private Stock Records singles
Comedy television theme songs
Songs about dreams